Washington Square Methodist Episcopal Church was a United Methodist church which was located at 135 West Fourth Street in New York City's Greenwich Village for almost 150 years. It was built as a new and larger structure by the Sullivan Street Methodist church in 1860; a balcony added later was the first New York City example of one not supported by columns.  The building was sold by its remaining small congregation in 2004, which could no longer support maintenance on the structure. This congregation briefly rented space in Trinity Chapel, New York University (1964), before joining with two other Methodist congregations to create the Church of the Village. Washington Square United Methodist Church was known as "The Peace Church" when under the leadership of Finley Schaef resulting from the congregation's opposition to the Vietnam War. Paul Abels, New York City's first openly gay clergyman, served as the church's pastor from 1973 to 1984 and promoted acceptance of the gay and lesbian community.  The church could not be demolished as it was located in the Greenwich Village Historic District and was instead converted into Novare, a condominium apartment building.

See also 
 Methodist Episcopal Church

References

External links 
 

19th-century Methodist church buildings in the United States
Churches completed in 1860
Closed churches in New York City
Greenwich Village
Housing in New York City
Methodist churches in New York City
Methodist Episcopal churches in the United States